Albert Spaggiari (14 December 1932 – 8 June 1989), nicknamed Bert, was a French criminal chiefly known as the organizer of a break-in into a Société Générale bank in Nice, France, in July 1976.

Early life

Albert Spaggiari was born on 14 December 1932 in Laragne-Montéglin in the Hautes-Alpes to Richard and Marcelle (née Clément) Spaggiari. His father died in 1935 and he grew up in Hyères, where his mother ran a lingerie store.

At the age of 19, he enlisted as a paratrooper in the First Indochina War, and was posted to the 3rd Battalion colonial paratroopers. During this time, he and a few accomplices put a gun to the head of someone that they claimed had robbed them. The military court, however, believed that this was actually a stickup, and Spaggiari spent the next four years in jail.

Following his release, he moved to North Africa and joined the Secret Armed Organisation (OAS), a right-wing group that wanted to prevent Algerian independence. This later led him to be sentenced to three and a half more years in jail, on the charges of political terrorism. 

Spaggiari, seemingly having had put politics behind him, then moved to Nice, France, alongside his wife, Audi. They lived in a country villa, called The Wild Geese, where they raised chickens. Professionally, he started working as a photographer.

Work with the DINA 
In 1975 Albert Spaggiari and the Corsican Brotherhood (CB) were recruited in France by the Chilean secret police, DINA.

His codename was "Daniel", his activities are unknown but other CB members were tasked with watching Chilean exiles in France.

This group was called the DINA "Brigada Corsa" ("Corsican Brigade").

Bank robbery in Nice

When Spaggiari heard that the sewers were close to the vault of the Société Générale bank in Nice, he began to plan a break-in into the bank. Eventually he decided to attempt digging into the bank vault from below. Spaggiari rented a box in the bank vault for himself and put a loud alarm clock in the vault. He set the clock to ring at night to check for any acoustic or seismic detection gear. In fact, there were no alarms protecting the vault because it was considered impenetrable: the door wall was extremely thick, and there was no obvious way to access the other walls.

Spaggiari contacted professional gangsters from Marseille, who, after examining his plans and the site, decided not to participate in the heist. His accomplices probably were recruited through old OAS friends. His men made their way into the sewers and spent two months digging an  tunnel from the sewer to the vault floor. Spaggiari had taken many precautions during this long dig while his men worked long hours continuously drilling. He told them not to drink coffee or alcohol, and to get at least ten hours of sleep every shift to avoid any danger to the mission.

On 16 July 1976, during the long weekend of Bastille Day, Spaggiari's gang broke into the vault itself. They opened 400 safe deposit boxes and stole an estimated 30–100 million francs worth of money, securities and valuables. It was the largest heist in the history of bank robberies to that date.

According to some accounts, Spaggiari brought his men a meal including wine and pâté, and reportedly they sat down in the vault for a picnic lunch, after welding the vault door shut from the inside. The gang spent hours picking through the various safe deposit boxes. Before they left on 20 July they left a message on the walls of the vault: sans armes, ni haine, ni violence ("without weapons, neither hatred, nor violence").

Claim of responsibility by Cassandri

In 2010 Jacques Cassandri published a book, The Truth about the Nice Heist, in which he claimed responsibility for the 1976 robbery and that Albert Spaggiari only played a bit part. He could not be prosecuted for the crime under French law as it was too long ago. However, he was arrested on suspicion of later money laundering, using proceeds of the robbery to fund business ventures in Marseilles and Corsica. About twenty people were held for questioning in connection with the case, including Cassandri's wife and children and a Corsican politician.

Capture and escape

At first the French police were baffled. However, by the end of October, they were closing in, and on a tip from a former girlfriend, they arrested one of the thieves. After a lengthy interrogation he implicated the entire gang, including Spaggiari. When Spaggiari, who had been accompanying the mayor of Nice Jacques Médecin in the Far East as a photographer, returned to Nice, he was arrested at the airport.

Spaggiari chose Jacques Peyrat, a veteran of the French Foreign Legion who belonged at the time to the National Front, as his defence attorney. Spaggiari first denied his involvement in the break-in, then acknowledged it but claimed that he was working to fund a secret political organization named Catena (Italian for "chain") that seems to have existed only in his fantasy.

During his case hearings, Spaggiari devised an escape plan. He made a fictitious document which he claimed as evidence. He made the document coded so it had to be deciphered by the judge. While judge Richard Bouaziz was distracted by the document, Spaggiari jumped out of a window, landing safely on a parked car and escaped on a waiting motorcycle. Some reports said that the owner of the car later received a 5,000-franc cheque in the mail for the damage to his roof.

Left-wing papers later said that Spaggiari had received help from his political friends, in particular from former OAS militants close to the mayor of Nice, Jacques Médecin. The accusations forced Médecin to go through a second round of voting at the local elections of 1977.

In 1995, Jacques Peyrat accused Christian Estrosi, French minister and former motorcycle champion, of having been Spaggiari's driver, but Estrosi proved that he had been racing in Daytona Beach, Florida, at the time.

Life in hiding

Spaggiari remained free for the rest of his life. He was sentenced in absentia to life imprisonment. He is reported to have had plastic surgery, and to have spent probably most of the rest of his life in Argentina, visiting France clandestinely to see his mother or his wife "Audi". While publishing his last book Le journal d'une truffe an interview with him by Bernard Pivot was recorded, reportedly in Milan, Italy, for the TV program Apostrophes.

According to a CIA document declassified in 2000 and published by the National Security Archive, Michael Townley, the DINA international agent responsible for the murder of Orlando Letelier, a member of Salvador Allende's government, in Washington, DC, 1976, was in contact with Spaggiari. Information contained in the document suggests that Spaggiari (code name "Daniel") conducted operations on behalf of DINA.

Spaggiari was said to have died under "mysterious circumstances". The press reported that his body was found by his mother in front of her home on 10 June 1989, having been carried back to France by unknown friends. However it now seems well established that his wife Emilia was with him when he died of lung cancer on 8 June 1989, in a country house in Belluno, Italy. She drove his body from Italy to Hyères and lied to the police—unauthorised transport of a corpse is a criminal offence in both Italy and France.

None of the proceeds of the robbery were ever found.

Works
Faut pas rire avec les barbares (1977)
Les égouts du paradis (1978)
Le journal d'une truffe (1983)
Translated into English by Martin Sokolinsky and published as Fric-Frac: The Great Riviera Bank Robbery (1979) and The Sewers of Gold (1981).

Popular culture

French authors René Louis Maurice and Jean-Claude Simoën wrote the book Cinq Milliards au bout de l'égout (1977) about Spaggiari's bank heist in Nice. Their work was translated to English in 1978 by British author Ken Follett under the title The Heist of the Century; it was also published as The Gentleman of 16 July and Under the Streets of Nice. Follett was outraged when some publishers marketed it as a new Ken Follett book, while it was, in fact, little more than a rushed-through translation.

Three films were produced which were also based on the Nice bank robbery:
 Les égouts du paradis, a 1979 French film directed by José Giovanni.
 The Great Riviera Bank Robbery, also known Dirty Money and Sewers of Gold, a 1979 British film directed by Francis Megahy.
 Sans arme, ni haine, ni violence, a 2008 French film directed by Jean-Paul Rouve.

The Canadian television series Masterminds produced and aired an episode titled "The Riviera Job," reenacting the story of the robbery.

A Czech film, Prachy dělaj člověka, contains a reference to the heist, suggesting that one of the characters participated in it.

In 2016, Italian author Carlos D'Ercole published a book about the heist titled Le Fogne del paradiso.

References

External links

 Albert Spaggiari page dealing with multimedia and detailed articles 
 The OAS, the French Underworld, and the 1976 Société Générale Heist at Bright Review
 The Pinochet File: A Declassified Dossier on Atrocity and Accountability

1932 births
1989 deaths
20th-century French criminals
People from Hautes-Alpes
French bank robbers
Bank burglars
Members of the Organisation armée secrète
Deaths from esophageal cancer
Deaths from cancer in Veneto
French people of Italian descent